Khalid Al-Ghamdi (born 28 March 1988) is a Saudi Arabian footballer who currently plays Pro League side for Al-Shabab.

Career statistics

Club

Honours

Club
Al-Nassr
 Saudi Professional League: 2013–14, 2014–15
 Saudi Crown Prince Cup: 2013–14

References

1988 births
Living people
People from Khobar
Association football fullbacks
Saudi Arabian footballers
Al-Qadsiah FC players
Al Nassr FC players
Al-Raed FC players
Al-Faisaly FC players
Al-Shabab FC (Riyadh) players
Saudi Professional League players
Saudi Arabia international footballers